Conner Street Historic District is a national historic district located at Noblesville, Hamilton County, Indiana.   It encompasses 146 contributing buildings in a predominantly residential section of Noblesville. It developed between about 1840 and 1947, and includes notable examples of Queen Anne, Italianate, Colonial Revival, Classical Revival, and Bungalow / American Craftsman style architecture. Located in the district are the separately listed William Houston Craig House and Daniel Craycraft House. Other notable buildings include the Heylmann House (c. 1910), Gaeth House (c. 1905), Wild House (c. 1905), Noblesville High School Gymnasium (c. 1923 / 1990), First Presbyterian Church (c. 1893 / 1989), and Charles Swain House (c. 1852).

It was listed on the National Register of Historic Places in 1999.

References

Historic districts on the National Register of Historic Places in Indiana
Queen Anne architecture in Indiana
Italianate architecture in Indiana
Colonial Revival architecture in Indiana
Neoclassical architecture in Indiana
Historic districts in Hamilton County, Indiana
National Register of Historic Places in Hamilton County, Indiana